Teleilat el-Ghassul, also spelled Tuleilat el-Ghassul and Tulaylât al-Ghassûl, is the site of several small hillocks (tuleilat, 'small tells') containing the remains of a number of Neolithic and Chalcolithic villages in Jordan. It is the type-site of the Ghassulian culture, which flourished in the Southern Levant during the Middle and Late Chalcolithic period (c. 4400 – c. 3500 BC). It is located in the lower eastern Jordan Valley, opposite and a little to the south of Jericho and 5-6 kilometers northeast of the Dead Sea. Teleilat el-Ghassul was occupied for a relatively long period of time during the Chalcolithic era - 8 successive Chalcolithic phases of occupation were identified there, most of them belonging to the Ghassulian culture.

Excavations
The site was excavated between 1929 and 1938 by Alexis Mallon and Robert Koeppel of the Jesuit Pontifical Biblical Institute in Jerusalem, assisted by prehistorian René Neuville. They identified 5 layers of settlement that belonged to the same culture. It was excavated again, between 1959 and 1960, by a PBI expedition led by Robert North, S.J. In 1967, in an expedition of The University of Sydney directed by Basil Hennessy, 9 phases of occupation were identified on the site (phases A-I), with an additional phase, A*, that had been lost to erosion. Of these, phases A*-G were dated to the Chalcolithic era and phases H and I - the basal layers - were dated to the Late Neolithic. He also discerned 5 episodes of campfloor occupation, interleaved with those of more substantial architecture. The topmost layer of the site had apparently been eroded by nature and by human activity, and might actually have represented several separate occupation phases. Hennessy conducted excavations on the site again from 1975 to 1977.

Another team from The University of Sydney, led by Stephen J. Bourke, worked on the site between 1994 and 1999. Bourke divided all phases of occupation discovered on the site into 6 archaeological horizons, with horizons 1-5 comprising the Chalcolithic phases and horizon 6 - the Late Neolithic ones.

Late-Neolithic architecture
The earlier, Late Neolithic settlers, built semi-subterranean, ovoid houses, that contained a single room. Most of one such housing unit was excavated by Hennessy, suggesting its dimensions were around 4 x 2.5 meters. The lower parts of the walls were made of pisé, with upperworks of less permanent materials. Also, exterior storage pits, patches of pebble paving and semi permanent built features were discovered, suggesting a modest sophistication of the external built environment.

Chalcolithic

Architecture 
It was concluded that Teleilat el-Ghassul had been the site of several small Chalcolithic villages that subsisted on agriculture and on animal husbandry. Their houses were rectilinear, built of manually shaped dried mud bricks laid on stone foundations. The houses had yards and rooms of various sized which contained different appliances. They display an increased sophistication over time, in construction techniques, in building size and built fittings - internal and external - and a growing regulation and sequestration of exterior spaces.

Tools and pottery
Many flint tools were discovered in Teleilat el-Ghassul, mainly axes, hoes and sickles, which had probably been used for agriculture. Particularly worthy of note are the fan scrapers - a flat flint tool shaped as a fan - which were mainly used for skinning and butchering animals, and for hide working, but possibly also for working bone and for cutting wood. They may have also had ritualistic significance. The pottery assemblage is particularly rich, utilizing different shapes and decorations. Also, a vessel that was probably used as a butter churn was found on site. It is a large, broad, vessel, with a handle at each end. Much of the Ghassulian pottery was made standing on mats, which left an imprint of the mat design on the bottom of the vessels.

Art and religion
The most impressive discovery at Teleilat el-Ghassul is the colorful wall paintings found in some of the houses dated to the Chalcolithic period (though they are not present in the earliest Chalcolithic phases). They were applied to the wall on top of a layer of plaster. Their condition is poor and many are missing today. The largest and most complete of those is 1.84 meters in diameter. It is very accurate and delicate, displaying a rather developed painting technique which likely involved the use of rulers to draw neat straight lines.

Some of the wall paintings represent mythological beasts while others, according to some opinions, represent priests wearing ritualistic masks. It is very difficult to infer the meaning of these drawings, though it mostly likely was related to Ghassulian mythology and religion. In one of the houses, over 20 layers of plaster, one on top of the other and each covered in paintings, were found by Hennessey.

No building that could be identified as a temple or as a common place of worship has been found in Teleilat el-Ghassul. It appears these religious paintings adorned the walls of private domiciles, and that, consequently, Ghassulian religious rituals were conducted at home.

See also
 Chalcolithic Temple of Ein Gedi
 David Ussishkin (born 1935), Israeli archaeologist
 Beersheba Culture, Late Chalcolithic archaeological culture

References

External Links
Photos of Teleilat Ghassul excavation at the American Center of Research

1929 archaeological discoveries
Archaeological sites in Jordan
Chalcolithic sites of Asia
Neolithic sites of Asia
Late Neolithic
Ghassulian